Somdet Chao Phraya may refer to:

 Somdet Chao Phraya, a title of the Thai nobility
 Somdet Chao Phraya Subdistrict, a subdistrict (khwaeng) of Bangkok
 Somdet Chaopraya Institute of Psychiatry, a psychiatric hospital in Bangkok